Cocaine Cowboys 2, also known as Cocaine Cowboys II: Hustlin' With the Godmother, is a 2008 documentary film sequel to Cocaine Cowboys (2006). Directed by Billy Corben and Lisa M. Perry and produced by Rakontur, the film "stars" Charles Cosby, Nelson Andreu, and Jorge "Rivi" Ayala and features the Colombian-born "Cocaine Godmother", drug lord Griselda Blanco.

Set in 1992, the film is largely narrated by Cosby, a small-time cocaine dealer from a broken home located in Oakland's inner-city. The film "follows Charles Cosby, a small time coke dealer in Oakland, California whose life is changed forever when he writes a fan letter to the "Cocaine Godmother" Griselda Blanco, who is serving time at a nearby federal prison. Six months later, Cosby is a multi-millionaire, Blanco's lover, and the head of her $40 million a year cocaine business." Although Blanco was imprisoned by the time Cosby met her, through Cosby and other intermediates, she was still able to organize a multi-million dollar cocaine empire, importing cocaine into California and distributing it to various locations across the United States.

The relationship between Blanco and Cosby eventually came to an end when Jorge "Rivi" Ayala, Blanco's former hitman and enforcer, agreed to testify against her on the subject of several murders she had ordered. Blanco, facing a possible death sentence, attempted to organize the kidnapping of John F. Kennedy Jr., aiming to use him as a hostage to secure her release. Cosby claims to have balked at the prospect of engaging in such a serious crime with a lengthy sentence, preventing the kidnapping from taking place. Cosby himself was later subpoenaed to testify against Blanco, but the case against her collapsed when Rivi was implicated in a phone sex scandal with secretaries in the Florida State Attorney's office. Blanco was deported from the United States after her sentence was complete.

The documentary also explores Blanco's criminal past, including her rise to prominence in the Miami drug trade, before her involvement in escalating criminal conflict in Miami, her relocation to California and eventual imprisonment.

Acting credits
 Charles Cosby – Himself
 Donovan Kennedy – Himself
 Will Collins – Himself
 Jorge "Rivi" Ayala – Himself
 Al Singleton – Himself
 Bob Palombo – Himself
 Nelson Andreu – Himself
 Raul Diaz – Himself
 Luis Casuso – Himself
 Samuel I. Burstyn – Himself

References

External links

 Cocaine Cowboys II: Hustlin' With the Godmother at Rakontur.com

2008 films
American documentary films
Cocaine in the United States
Documentary films about organized crime in the United States
Documentary films about the illegal drug trade
Films about cocaine
Works about Colombian drug cartels
Crime in Florida
2008 documentary films
Crime in California
History of Oakland, California
History of Miami
Films directed by Billy Corben
Documentary films about California
2000s English-language films
2000s American films